The Palestinian Authority Martyrs Fund is a fund operated by the Palestinian Authority (PA) which pays monthly cash stipends to the families of Palestinians killed, injured, or imprisoned while carrying out politically motivated violence against Israel. The fund also makes disbursements to innocent bystanders killed during violent events and Palestinians imprisoned in Israeli jails for ordinary crimes. The Fund traces its origins to a fund created by Fatah in 1964 to support the widows and orphans of Palestinian fedayeen. The scheme has been described as "pay for slay", and has been criticised by some as encouraging terrorism. In 2016, the PA paid out about NIS 1.1 billion (US$303 million) in stipends and other benefits to the families of so-called “martyrs”.

In 2010 (or 2014), the mounting criticism of the payments led to the PA transferring management of the Martyrs Fund to the Palestinian Detainees and Ex-Detainees Affairs Commission, of the Palestine Liberation Organization (PLO), which now disburses the government-funding to recipients and their families.

History
The Palestine Mujahidin and Martyrs Fund was established in 1964 by Fatah to recompense the families of dead and wounded militants. In 1971 it was replaced by the Society for the Care of Palestinian Martyrs and Prisoners. The Society defined as "military martyrs" not only as Palestinian fedayeen killed during terrorist operations but to include fedayeen who died of natural causes while on active service. Their families received cash stipends. Non-members of the Palestine Liberation Organization killed during any kind of encounter with Israeli security forces were given a one-time payment; this created an incentive for families to apply posthumously to have their dead relatives reclassified as fighters.

SAMED, the Palestine Martyrs Works Society, was founded in 1970, and handled some of the martyr payments and provided employment in the Palestinian refugee camps in Lebanon in the 1970s.

The payments were routinized during the Second Intifada (2000–2005). In 2016, payments were made to 35,000 families, including the families of suicide bombers, from a 2016 annual budget of $170 million. The stipend is higher than the average Palestinian wage.

The question of whether militants from all political factions will receive such payments from the PA has been highly contested within Palestinian society, with President Mahmoud Abbas withdrawing, then in 2009 restoring, such payments for prisoners belonging to the PLO, but the government claims that it does not make such payments to families of prisoners belonging to Hamas or Islamic Jihad.

In July 2018, Australia ended direct aid to the PA through the World Bank, amid growing concerns that Australia's tax dollars may be helping to fund terrorism.

Names
The fund is often referred to as the Martyrs Fund, and, pejoratively, as "Pay for Slay."

A series of funding agencies have existed over the decades, including "Fund for Families of Martyrs and the Injured."

Benefits paid
The funding system pays regular stipends to imprisoned individuals and to the surviving families of deceased individuals. The agencies that disburse the funds employ over 500 bureaucrats. Funds are dispersed via separate agencies, one for families of prisoners and the other for the general population. Both agencies are "PLO institutions," but they are both funded by the PA.

According to a report by Yossi Kuperwasser, of the Israeli advocacy group Jerusalem Center for Public Affairs, in 2017 half of the $693 million that the PA receives as foreign aid, $345 million, was paid out as stipends to convicted terrorists and their families. Israeli Prime Minister, Benjamin Netanyahu, repeated this claim in a speech to AIPAC in 2018. According to the Washington Post's fact-checking, the $350 million figure requires a broad brush classifying all recipients as terrorists; and the picture regarding funding is considered fuzzy because Palestinian budget lines combine terrorist and non-terrorist funding and primarily since the definition of a terrorist is disputed.

The Washington Post's analysis showed that in 2017, $160 million was paid to 13,000 beneficiaries of “prisoner payments” ($12,307 per person) and $183 million was paid to 33,700 families in about in “martyr payments” ($5,430 per family), of which:
$36 million is estimated to be paid to prisoners serving sentences of >20 years
$10 million is paid to former members of the security forces
$1 million is estimated to be paid to families of the 200 suicide bombers
$10 million is paid to the families of the Palestinians with life terms, lengthy sentences and in the security forces

In June 2021, the PA paid the family of a Palestinian who murdered two Israelis 30,000 Jordanian dinars (US$42,000) to “complete the payment of the price” of the family's house that was demolished by the IDF.

Prisoner fund
Under the Amended Palestinian Prisoners Law No. 19 (2004), prisoners who have served a year or more in Israeli prison are entitled upon release to health insurance and tuition-free school, university and professional education. If they become civil servants, the law stipulates that the Palestinian Authority will "pay his social security and pension fees . . . for the years he spent in prison.” Incarcerated individuals are entitled to monthly stipends "linked to the cost-of-living index." The 2013 amendments to the law entitle individuals released from prison a preference in getting jobs with the Palestinian Authority, and stipulates that the PA "will make up the difference" if the civil service salary "is lower than the salary he received in prison." Females who have served 2 years in prison, and males who have served 5 are entitled to receive stipends for the rest of their lives.

Foundation for the Care of the Families of Martyrs
The Foundation is dedicated to assisting an Arab who has been "wounded, killed, or otherwise affected as a result of their joining the revolution or the presence of the revolution" against Israel and operates within the PA's Ministry of Social Affairs. In 2016 it supported 35,100 families.

Countering Palestinian Authority claims that this is a welfare fund, the World Bank has stated that, "the program is clearly not targeted to the poorest households. While some assistance should be directed to this population, the level of resources devoted to the Fund for Martyrs and the Injured does not seem justified from welfare or fiscal perspective."

Stipends
Stipends are paid to families of both prisoners and Palestinians killed in contexts ranging from political demonstrations that turn violent where protesters are killed by non-lethal riot control methods (such as being hit by a tear gas canister) and to individuals imprisoned for "common crimes". The fund also pays $106 a month in "canteen money" to all imprisoned Palestinians, including those imprisoned for non-political crimes such as car theft and drug dealing, for prisoners to spend in the prison canteen.

Families of individuals killed by Israeli security forces are paid stipends of about $800 to $1,000 per month. The families of convicted Palestinians serving time in Israeli prisons receive $3,000 or higher per month.

Douglas J. Feith calls the stipends "cash incentives" to spur Arabs to undertake car ramming and stabbing as a terrorist tactic.

Salam Fayyad, a former PA Prime Minister and Finance Minister, stated that between January 1995 and June 2002 the fund distributed NIS 16 million to families of prisoners annually, and between June 2002 to June 2004 NIS 88.5 million annually.

In 2017 the National Association of the Martyrs’ Families of Palestine demanded cost of living increases in their stipends, which had been unchanged since 2011.

Private charities including the U.S. based Holyland Foundation have been accused of funding the stipends.

Hamas
Hamas has operated a separate Martyrs Fund since well before the 2007 insurgent coup d'etat resulting in the Hamas' takeover of Gaza.

In 2001, Sheik Ahmed Yassin, the founder of Hamas, boasted that Hamas payments to the families of prisoners and of suicide bombers totalled between $2 and $3 million. But according to a 2001 Israeli government report, the families of prisoners received an initial lump sum payment of $500 – $5,000, with monthly stipends of about $100, with higher payments for the families of Hamas members.

The Hamas-controlled Unlimited Friends Association for Social Development (UFA) in Gaza is supported by eight registered U.S. charities. By its own account, UFA distributes cash both to the needy and to "the families of martyrs and prisoners," and "families of martyrs of the Palestinian people".

Cultural role of "martyr payments" in Palestine
The "martyr" payments are "exceedingly popular" among Palestinians and have been described as "part of the ethos of Palestinian society." Ziad Asali, founding president of the American Task Force on Palestine, told a reporter that Palestinian politicians and the media have elevated these payments to the point where they are "sacred in Palestinian politics," and no government dares terminate the practice.

Professor Nathan Brown of George Washington University says that the stipends to prisoner's families are "universally supported among Palestinians."

The Palestinian Prisoners' Club defends the stipends; the club's leader, Qadura Fares, maintains that payments supporting the families of prisoners are just because the families, "are a part of our people" and that "the family did nothing against anyone." According to Fares, the attacks for which the prisoners were convicted are "not terror," but "part of the struggle" against Israel.

In June 2017, PA President Mahmoud Abbas called efforts to stop the martyr payments an "aggression against the Palestinian people," and defended the salaries paid to imprisoned Palestinians as a "social responsibility."

A public opinion poll commissioned by The Washington Institute for Near East Policy in June 2017 showed that two-thirds of Palestinians polled disagreed with the PA's policy, saying that Palestinian prisoners and their families do not deserve extra payments on account of their "armed operations", but should instead be given regular social benefits like other Palestinians.

Response by governments

Australia
In July 2018, Australia stopped the A$10 million (US$7.5 million) in funding that had been sent to the PA via the World Bank and instead is sending it to the UN Humanitarian Fund for the Palestinian Territories. The reason given was that they did not want the PA to use the funds to assist Palestinians convicted of politically motivated violence.

Israel
Prime Minister Netanyahu called the payments "an incentive for murder". The Israeli government, describing the payments as glorifying terrorism, responded to the June 2016 murder of Hallel Yaffa Ariel by threatening to deduct the value of "martyr" payments from the tax revenue it pays to the PA.

Speaking before the United Nations Security Council on 24 June 2017, Israeli ambassador Danny Danon, together with Oran Almog, one of the victims of the Maxim restaurant suicide bombing, demanded that the PA cease incentivizing terrorism by paying stipends to terrorists.

In July 2018, the Knesset passed a law for Israel to deduct the amount of money that the Palestinian Authority gives to terrorists and their families from the taxes and tariffs Israel collects for the PA. In July 2021, Israel deducted NIS 597 million for 2020 from the tax money Israel collects on behalf of the PA. PA funding was NIS 517.4 million in 2019. In September 2022 the Israeli government issued seizure orders for 10 million shekels that the PA transferred into the private accounts of security prisoners who were involved in deadly attacks.

Germany
During the month of September 2016, the government of Germany has expressed concerns about the payment of foreign aid to the PA in the light of the use of these funds to incentivize terrorism and has promised to investigate the matter.

Netherlands
In November 2019, the Netherlands cut the US$1.5 million per annum it paid directly to the Palestinian Authority over payments it makes to families of militants killed, hurt, or imprisoned by Israel.

Norway
In 2016, Børge Brende, Foreign Minister of Norway, demanded that the PA cease using Norwegian foreign aid for "martyr" stipends. He was satisfied with an assurance that Norwegian funds would not be used for the stipends, although the change was purely "cosmetic" since PA funds are fungible.

United States
Following the murder of Hallel Yaffa Ariel, a dual Israeli-U.S. national, in June 2016, the United States threatened to deduct the sums paid out to "martyrs" from the Martyrs Fund from the subsidies it grants to the PA.

On 23 March 2018, U.S. President Donald Trump signed the Taylor Force Act into law, which will cut about a third of US foreign aid payments to the PA, until the PA ceases making payment of stipends to terrorists and their surviving families.

References

Sources
Incentivizing Terrorism: Palestinian Authority Allocations to Terrorists and their Families, Brig.-Gen. (res.) Yossi Kuperwasser, Jerusalem Center for Public Affairs (2016) Incentivizing Terrorism: Palestinian Authority Allocations to Terrorists and their Families

1964 establishments in Asia
Economy of the State of Palestine
Welfare in the State of Palestine
Palestinian terrorism
1960s establishments in the West Bank Governorate